Urszula Modrzyńska (23 February 1928 – 11 December 2010) was a Polish stage and film actress.

Modrzyńska began her career on stage in 1949 in Wilam Horzyca Theater in Toruń. In the 1950s and 1960 she played several memorable parts in movies by Polish directors, namely by Andrzej Wajda (Dorota in Pokolenie - 1955)) and Aleksander Ford (Jagienka in Krzyżacy - 1960).

In the 1970s she played only smaller parts in movies by young directors, as in Droga w świetle księżyca by Witold Orzechowski (1972), Rozmowa by Piotr Andrejew (1974), and Zdjęcia Próbne by Agnieszka Holland, Paweł Kędzierski and Jerzy Domaradzki (1976), concentrating on her theater work at Nowy Theater in Łódź.

She retired in 1983 and died on 11 December 2010 in Łódź.

Filmography

External links
Urszula Modrzyńska at the Film Polski database

1928 births
2010 deaths
Polish film actresses
Polish stage actresses
20th-century Polish actresses
Recipient of the Meritorious Activist of Culture badge